Daniel Newell (born 30 October 1975) is a musician and author from London, England. He currently plays trumpet for Royal Opera House, London Symphony Orchestra and London Philharmonic Orchestra. He is widely known as "The Trumpet Man" for Muse's live album, HAARP, recorded at Wembley Stadium. 

He is also the author of Billy's Band books for children.

References

Living people
1975 births
Musicians from London
English trumpeters
Male trumpeters
Writers from London
21st-century trumpeters
21st-century British male musicians